Antonio Rodríguez Hernández, known as Julio Antonio (6 February 1889, Mora de Ebro – 15 February 1919, Madrid) was a Spanish sculptor.

Biography 

His first fully original sculpture, "Flores malsanas" (Wilting  Flowers), which he later destroyed, was created when they moved to Murcia. 

There, he worked in the studios of Miguel Blay, one of Spain's best known sculptors at that time. Despite his good experiences with Blay, he decided to leave and undertake a journey throughout the country with his friend, the painter . Later, they would set up their own studio together. In 1908, he created his first major work, "María, la gitana" (Maria, the Gypsy); which expressed his own personality and broke with the prevailing popular styles.

Just as his work was beginning to receive popular acclaim, he died of tuberculosis, aged 30. His best known work is a monument for those who defended Tarragona during the Peninsular War. He worked on it from 1910 until shortly before his death. Due to financing problems and disagreements over its location, it was not dedicated until 1931. A funerary monument for the Lemonier family, to honor their eldest son, who died at the age of 11, is also among his familiar creations. It was never placed at the tomb, and is now in the 

In November 2018, in preparation for the centenary of his death, his remains and those of his mother were exhumed from the Cementerio de la Almudena in Madrid, and relocated to the cemetery in Mora de Ebro.

Sources 
 Carolyn P. Boyd, "Julio Antonio, the “sculptor of the race”: The making of a modernist myth", in: Historia y Política #37 pp.395-413 
 María Victoria Gómez Alfeo, Fernando García Rodríguez, "Documentación y análisis de las críticas de arte sobre el escultor Julio Antonio, "el amado de la crítica"" in: Documentación de las Ciencias de la Información, Vol.27, pp.75-96 
 Silvio Lago, "Artistas contemporáneos. Julio Antonio" in: La Esfera, #268, 1919 
 Antonio Salcedo Miliani, Julio Antonio 1889-1919 Escultor, Barcelona Àmbit Serveis Editorials, 1997

External links 

 "Traslladen a Móra d'Ebre les restes de l'escultor Julio Antonio" @ YouTube (In Catalán, no subtitles)

1889 births
1919 deaths
Spanish sculptors
Spanish illustrators
20th-century deaths from tuberculosis
People from Ribera d'Ebre
Tuberculosis deaths in Spain